Augusto Ballerini (20 August 1857, Buenos Aires – 28 February 1902, Buenos Aires) was an Argentine painter of portraits, historical scenes and landscapes.

Life and work 
He began his studies with the Italian-born portrait painter, Francisco Romero (1840-1906). Upon Romero's recommendation, and with a government scholarship, he went to Italy to continue his studies. In 1875, he spent some time in Rome, taking private lessons from Cesare Maccari. He was in Florence in 1878, where he became part of a small group of Argentine artists who were studying there. Upon returning to Buenos Aires. he established himself painting portraits of notable people, and became an avid enthusiast for creating landscapes "en plein aire".

He compiled a notebook of sketches, some of which he developed into oil paintings. These included one of his best-known works, a monumental canvas depicting the Iguazú Falls.

In 1895, his painting "A Moonlit Night in Venice", was one of the first works by an Argentine artist to be purchased for the National Museum of Fine Arts. Two years later, he designed sets for the opera, Pampa, by Arturo Berutti

Although successful, he found it necessary to supplement his income by giving private art lessons. He also provided numerous drawings for the conservative daily, La Nación, and La Ilustración Argentina. Together with the artists Ángel Della Valle, whom he had met in Florence, and Ernesto de la Cárcova, he created "La Colmena" (The Hive), an institution devoted to promoting and exhibiting local art. Later, he was named an honorary member of a similar organization known as the "Sociedad Estímulo de Bellas Artes".

His last exhibit was in 1902, at the Salón Freitas y Castillo. He died suddenly, while it was still in progress. The following year, a major retrospective was held, featuring over 130 of his works.

Selected paintings

Sources 
 Brief biography and notes @ the Juan B. Castagnino Fine Arts Museum
 Brief biography @ Arte y Colección
 Brief biography @ Todos los Artistas, Fundación Tres Pinos

External links 

 Works by Ballerini and criticism @ the Museo Nacional de Bellas Artes

1857 births
1902 deaths
Argentine painters
Landscape painters
History painters
Artists from Buenos Aires